Arthyde Stone House is a historic bungalow in the former community of Arthyde, Minnesota, United States.  It was built circa 1922 using local fieldstone.  The Arthyde Stone House was listed on the National Register of Historic Places in 1982 for having local significance in the theme of exploration/settlement.  It was nominated for being a locally prominent reminder of the failed townsite speculation common to northern Minnesota's cutover land during the Roaring Twenties.

See also

 National Register of Historic Places listings in Aitkin County, Minnesota

References

1922 establishments in Minnesota
Bungalow architecture in Minnesota
Houses completed in 1922
Houses on the National Register of Historic Places in Minnesota
National Register of Historic Places in Aitkin County, Minnesota
Stone houses in the United States